Munim Shahriar (born 22 May 1998) is a Bangladeshi cricketer. He made his international debut for the Bangladesh cricket team in March 2022.

Career
He made his List A debut for Gazi Group Cricketers in the 2016–17 Dhaka Premier Division Cricket League on 29 April 2017. He made his Twenty20 debut for Abahani Limited in the 2018–19 Dhaka Premier Division Twenty20 Cricket League on 25 February 2019. He made his first-class debut on 31 October 2021, for Dhaka Metropolis in the 2021–22 National Cricket League.

In February 2022, he was named in Bangladesh's Twenty20 International (T20I) squad for the series against Afghanistan, following his performance in the 2021–22 Bangladesh Premier League. He made his T20I debut on 3 March 2022, for Bangladesh against Afghanistan.

References

External links
 

1998 births
Living people
Bangladeshi cricketers
Bangladesh Twenty20 International cricketers
Abahani Limited cricketers
Dhaka Metropolis cricketers
Gazi Group cricketers
People from Mymensingh